Dicoronylene is the trivial name for a very large polycyclic aromatic hydrocarbon. Its formal name is benzo[10,11]phenanthro[2',3',4',5',6':4,5,6,7]chryseno[1,2,3-bc]coronene (IUPAC name) or benzo[1,2,3-bc:4,5,6-b'c']dicoronene (name sometimes used in Chemical Abstracts). It has 15 rings and is a brick-red solid. Dicoronylene sublimes under high vacuum, 0.001 torr, between 250 °C and 300 °C.

Structure
Due to its large size and limited availability, the organic chemistry of dicoronylene is little known. Dicoronylene does undergo a Diels–Alder reaction with maleic anhydride on one or both of the central bay regions on either side of the bridging ring. The double bond of maleic anhydride forms two carbon–carbon bonds on the ends of the bay region, making a new six-membered ring. Heating removes the anhydride as carbon dioxide gas and gives the corresponding 16-ring and 17-ring PAHs.

Occurrence
Dicoronylene was first observed in the solid residue produced in coal gasification. This residue contained large amounts of coronene and ovalene. After these were extracted and identified, a reddish residue remained, which was sparingly soluble in organic solvents. Elemental analysis indicated that it was most likely the condensed dimer of coronene. 

Dicoronylene was later discovered to occur as a by-product of the catalytic hydrocracking used in petroleum processing. It is formed when two coronene molecules fuse. It is estimated that catalytical hydrocracking produces several hundred metric tons of dicoronylene worldwide per year, making it the most prevalent large PAH. In this process, the analogous 18-ring PAH formed from coronene and ovalene is also formed in 1% to 20% proportions. It is purple in color.

Properties
The formation of dicoronylene in hydrocracking reactors is a serious problem because its low solubility make it precipitate in any cooler part of the reactor flow path. This causes plugging of flow lines that require periodic shutdown and removal of the reddish deposits. Dicoronylene is also a constituent of coke formed on hydrocracking catalysts, which reduces their activity.

Thermal pyrolysis of coronene shows masses of dicoronylene and the condensed trimer, tetramer, and pentamer in the mass spectrum of the black product. These larger coronene condensates are black in color.

Dicoronylene is moderately soluble in 1,2,4-trichlorobenzene and these solutions have a greenish yellow fluorescence. Unlike coronene, dicoronylene has symmetrical fluorescence excitation and emission spectra. It is virtually insoluble in most solvents.

Dicoronylene has been studied as a model for interstellar PAHs. Its large size and planarity have also shown promise as a chromatographic separation material.

References

Polycyclic aromatic hydrocarbons